Georg Barfuß (born June 10, 1944) is a German politician, a representative of the FDP.

He was educated in lauingen elementary school 1950-57 then 1957-60 Donauwörth private school before going to Donauwörth vocational school 1960-62.

He served as mayor of lauingen, where he commissioned the Hicret Mosque, earning him the nickname "Türkenschorsch".

He was a member of the Landtag of Bavaria. He served as a member of the CSU for 24 years before joining the FDP for 4 years.

He is married with five children.

See also
List of Bavarian Christian Social Union politicians

References

External links
Official site

Christian Social Union in Bavaria politicians
1944 births
Living people